Quasimitra puncticulata, common name : the punctured mitre, is a species of sea snail, a marine gastropod mollusk in the family Mitridae, the miters or miter snails.

Description
The shell size varies between 25 mm and 57 mm.

Distribution
This species is distributed in the Indian Ocean along Madagascar and in the Central Pacific Ocean along the Philippines, Okinawa,  Australia and Papua New Guinea.

References

 Dautzenberg, Ph. (1929). Mollusques testaces marins de Madagascar. Faune des Colonies Francaises, Tome III
 Cernohorsky W. O. (1976). The Mitrinae of the World. Indo-Pacific Mollusca 3(17) page(s): 447

puncticulata
Gastropods described in 1811